Turbonilla interrupta, common name the interrupted turbonille, is a species of sea snail, a marine gastropod mollusk in the family Pyramidellidae, the pyrams and their allies.

Description
The shell grows to a length of 8 mm.

Distribution
This species occurs in the following locations:
 Caribbean Sea: Cuba, Venezuela
 Gulf of Mexico: Mexico
 Lesser Antilles
 Atlantic Ocean: Gulf of Maine, Gulf of St Lawrence (Canada), Azores, Argentina
 Puerto Rico
 United Kingdom Exclusive Economic Zone
 Mediterranean Sea.

Notes
Additional information regarding this species:
 Diet: generally for group, planktonic and minute detrital food items through either suspension or deposit feeding
 Dimensions: maximum size of 6 to 8 mm
 Distribution: Range: 47°N to 41.7°S; 97.7°W to 37°W. Distribution: Canada; Canada: Gulf of St. Lawrence, Nova Scotia; USA: Massachusetts, Rhode Island, New York, New Jersey, Georgia, Florida; Florida: East Florida, West Florida; USA: Louisiana, Texas; Mexico; Mexico: Tabasco, Veracruz, Campeche State, Yucatán State, Quintana Roo; Venezuela; Venezuela: Falcon; St. Vincent & the Grenadines: Grenada; Barbados, Brazil; Brazil: Amapa, Para, Ceara, Rio Grande do Norte, Rio de Janeiro, São Paulo, Parana; Uruguay, Argentina; Argentina: Buenos Aires, Rio Negro
 Habitat: infralittoral of the Gulf and estuary
 Reproduction: sexes are separate but are seldom conspicuously different externally, simultaneous hermaphrodites yet self-fertilization is prevented due to various morphological, physiological, or behavioral mechanisms; generally, marine gastropods shed their eggs

References

 Holmes, F. S. 1859. Post-Pleiocene fossils of South-Carolina.  65-98, pls. 11-14. Russell & Jones: Charleston, South Carolina
 Verrill, A. E. 1873. Report on the invertebrate animals of Vineyard Sound and the adjacent waters, with an account of the physical characters of the region. United States Commission of Fish and Fisheries, Report, 1871 and 1872: 295-778, pls. 1-18. 
 Bush, K. J. 1899. Descriptions of new species of Turbonilla of the Western Atlantic fauna, with notes on those previously known. Proceedings of the Academy of Natural Sciences of Philadelphia 51: 145-177, pl. 8.
 Bartsch, P. 1909. Pyramidellidae of New England and the adjacent region. Proceedings of the Boston Society of Natural History 34: 67-113, pls. 11-14. 
 Bush, K. J. 1909. Notes on the family Pyramidellidae. American Journal of Science 27: 475-484.

External links
 To Biodiversity Heritage Library (60 publications)
 To Encyclopedia of Life
 To USNM Invertebrate Zoology Mollusca Collection
 To ITIS
 To World Register of Marine Species

interrupta
Gastropods described in 1835